Fantasy Forest is a series of ten gamebooks published by TSR, Inc. from 1983 to 1984. The books are works of children's literature; eight of them are set in the fantasy world of the Dungeons and Dragons role-playing game created by Wizards of the Coast, and two are set in TSR's science fiction world of Star Frontiers. They have been compared to other gamebook series, such as Choose Your Own Adventure or Endless Quest.

Format
The series was based upon a concept created by Edward Packard and originally published as the "Adventures of You" series, starting with Packard's Sugarcane Island in 1976. Each story in the Fantasy Forest series is written from a second-person point of view, with the reader assuming the role of the protagonist and making choices that determine the main character's actions and the plot's outcome. Unlike many gamebooks in which the reader's character is left purposefully gender-neutral, there are several Fantasy Forest books in which the reader is placed in an unambiguously female protagonist's shoes.

Books

See also 
 Choose Your Own Adventure

References

External links
 Fantasy Forest at Demian's Gamebook Web Page
 Fantasy Forest board game by TSR

Fantasy gamebooks
Fantasy books by series
Gamebooks
Series of children's books
TSR, Inc. games